The Tank Corps of the American Expeditionary Forces was the mechanized unit that engaged in tank warfare for the American Expeditionary Forces (AEF) on the Western Front during World War I.

Organization

Brigadier General Samuel D. Rockenbach, as the Chief of Tank Corps for the American Expeditionary Forces under Pershing, organized, trained, equipped and then deployed the first American tank units to the Western Front of 1918 Europe. An initial plan for 2,000 light Renault FT tanks and 200 heavy British Mark VI tanks was changed to 20 battalions of 77 light tanks each and 10 battalions of 45 heavy tanks each. A total of eight heavy battalions (the 301st to 308th) and 21 light battalions (the 326th to 346th) were raised, but only four (the 301st, 331st, 344th and 345th) saw combat.

Captain George S. Patton, the first officer assigned to the unit, set up a light tank school at Bourg, France, starting on 10 November 1917. In the first half of 1918, the 326th and 327th Tank Battalions were organized at Patton's school, while the 301st Heavy Tank Battalion was raised at Camp Meade, Maryland, USA and transported to the British Tank School at Bovington Camp in southern England, for training.

Combat operations

The 326th (under the command of Sereno E. Brett) and 327th Tank Battalions (later renamed the 344th and 345th and organized into the 304th Tank Brigade, commanded by Patton), were the first into combat, beginning with the Battle of Saint-Mihiel as part of the US IV Corps on 12 September 1918. The small French Renault FT tanks they were equipped with found the going hard and many were lost or ran out of fuel crossing the battlefield – the Germans, forewarned, had largely retreated from the salient. The tanks then took part in the Meuse–Argonne offensive as part of the US V Corps on 26 September. Major Brett assumed command of the 304th after Patton was injured on 26 September, the first day of the Meuse-Argonne Offensive near Cheppy, France.
 

During the war, two members of the Tank Corps (both from the 344th Battalion) were awarded the Medal of Honor; Donald M. Call and Harold W. Roberts.

Post-war
When the fighting ended on November 11, 1918, the AEF Tank Corps and the units in American had about 20,000 men. The AEF Tank Corps was removed after 11 November 1918, armistice and remaining tank corps personnel transferred to the United States, where the Tank Corps, National Army, was disbanded with the National Army in 1920. Headquarters and Headquarters Company (HHC), 304th Tank Brigade, Tank Corps, were transferred to Camp Meade, Maryland and consolidated with HHC, 305th Tank Brigade on 22 June 1921, reorganized and redesignated HHC, 1st Tank Group. This organization was reorganized and redesignated HHC, 1st Tank Regiment on 1 September 1929. The 1st Tank Regiment was reorganized and redesignated the 66th Infantry Regiment (Light Tanks) on 25 October 1932.

References

 - Total pages: 172
Military units and formations of the United States in World War I